Al-Suwaira is a city in Al-Suwaira District, Wasit Governorate, Iraq. It is located on the west bank of the Tigris, 35 km south of Baghdad. It is surrounded by fruit groves and palm orchards. It has a population of 77,200, predominantly Shia Arabs.

References

Populated places along the Silk Road
District capitals of Iraq
Cities in Iraq